Mark Buford (born October 8, 1970) is an American former professional basketball player. He played for the Mississippi Valley State Delta Devils for three seasons. Buford was selected by the Phoenix Suns as the 49th overall pick in the 1993 NBA draft but did not sign with the team. He was signed by the Cleveland Cavaliers in 1994 but was waived before the start of the season. Buford played professionally in Italy and Argentina (two seasons) as well as in the American Continental Basketball Association and United States Basketball League.

Career statistics

College

|-
| style="text-align:left;"| 1990–91
| style="text-align:left;"| Mississippi Valley State
| 18 || – || 13.8 || .408 || – || .200 || 2.3 || .0 || .4 || .3 || 2.3
|-
| style="text-align:left;"| 1991–92
| style="text-align:left;"| Mississippi Valley State
| 30 || – || 19.9 || .453 || – || .618 || 5.8 || .2 || .6 || .8 || 4.9
|-
| style="text-align:left;"| 1992–93
| style="text-align:left;"| Mississippi Valley State
| 28 || – || 26.1 || .453 || .000 || .551 || 7.4 || .1 || .8 || .6 || 12.9
|- class="sortbottom"
| style="text-align:center;" colspan="2"| Career
| 76 || – || 20.7 || .449 || .000 || .555 || 5.6 || .1 || .7 || .6 || 7.2

References

External links
 College basketball statistics
 CBA stats
 Le Lega profile
 Argentine league stats

1970 births
Living people
African-American basketball players
American expatriate basketball people in Argentina
American expatriate basketball people in Italy
American men's basketball players
Basketball players from Memphis, Tennessee
Centers (basketball)
Gimnasia y Esgrima de Comodoro Rivadavia basketball players
Mississippi Valley State Delta Devils basketball players
Pallacanestro Varese players
Phoenix Suns draft picks
Shreveport Crawdads players
Tri-City Chinook players
21st-century African-American sportspeople
20th-century African-American sportspeople